Éric Bompard SA is a French high-fashion cashmere wool goods manufacturer established in 1984.

History 
Éric Bompard, an entrepreneur and former computer technician, created the company in 1984 following a trip to Asia where he learned about cashmere weaving.

In the 2010s, Éric Bompard began passing over leadership to his daughter, Lorraine de Gournay, for her to later become the chief executive officer (CEO).

In 2018, Xavier Marie, the founder of Maisons du Monde, together with Apax Partners and BPI France, announced their acquisition of Éric Bompard.

The company subsequently launched an advertising campaign in late 2019, promoting its image through a "Cachemire Family".

In March 2020, Barbara Werschine was announced as the company's new CEO.

References

Clothing retailers of France